Stephen Daryl King (born November 1963) is a British economist. He is senior economic adviser at HSBC Holdings, where he was chief economist from 1998 to July 2015. King also works as a journalist and consultant, and is a specialist adviser to the House of Commons Treasury Committee.

He is author of Losing Control: The Emerging Threats to Western Prosperity (2010), When the Money Runs Out: The End of Western Affluence (2013) and Grave New World: The End of Globalization, the Return of History (2017).

King identifies as a "Jew through choice", converting to Judaism in 1991. He has described experiencing antisemitism since his conversion and believes that antisemitism has become worse over time.

References 

1963 births
British economists
British Jews
British non-fiction writers
Converts to Judaism
Living people